Creature House Expression was an award-winning vector graphics editor developed by Creature House in Hong Kong, founded by Alex S.C. Hsu and Irene H. H. Lee. It was initially marketed through a developer/publisher agreement with Ray Dream Inc. subsequently Fractal Design Corporation and later MetaCreations under the trade name Fractal Design Expression.
 
The software was positioned as a companion to then-Fractal Design/MetaCreations Painter. Creature House regained full marketing rights from MetaCreations Corp. in late 2000 and published version 2 of the software under its own name as Creature House Expression.
 

The latest version of Creature House Expression published by Creature House Ltd is version 3.3.

In Sep 2003, Microsoft acquired the software product together with all related trademarks and titles and hired Dr. Alex S. C. Hsu as an architect. Eventually, Alex S. C. Hsu led a new Microsoft team to continue the development of the software under the code name Acrylic as part of a new Expression Suite Project initiated by Alex S. C. Hsu and others. In 2007, the original Expression application became part of Microsoft's Expression Studio suite of applications, rebranded and rewritten in WPF as Microsoft Expression Design. Windows XP and Vista versions are available, although Mac OS X support was officially discontinued.

Skeletal stroke
Expression uses a unique technology called skeletal stroke. There have been a few research papers on this technology, including the work of Alex S. C. Hsu and Irene H. H. Lee, who are the original developers of Expression.

LivingCels
Along with Expression, Create House also developed animation software called LivingCels, featuring the same technology, including skeletal strokes, as in Expression. LivingCels was released as a public preview, but never made it to final release after Creature House was purchased by Microsoft.

See also
 Microsoft Expression Design, the new product based on Creature House Expression
 List of vector graphics editors
 Comparison of vector graphics editors

References

External links
Creature House page: Expression 3
P&A., Inc. page: Expression 3J, Expression 3J Pure

Download Creature House Expression from Microsoft 
Archive.org archive of home page
Microsoft Expression 3.3 Freeware Windows version (57.3 MB), requires (No longer available) registration
, Microsoft Expression 3.3 Freeware Windows version direct link to above file, does not require registration
 Microsoft Expression 3.3 Freeware Mac OS 8/9/X version (55.8 MB), requires registration; there are versions for Mac OS 8/9 and Mac OS X in the archive
Update to Mac OS X version for Mac OS 10.3.5; fixes a startup problem (2.9 MB), no registration required
November 1996: Fractal Design Ships Expression for Macintosh

Reviews
MacWorld
About.com

Freeware
Vector graphics editors
Microsoft Expression products